The 20th Guldbagge Awards ceremony, presented by the Swedish Film Institute, honored the best Swedish films of 1984, and took place on 24 January 1985. Beyond Sorrow, Beyond Pain directed by Agneta Elers-Jarleman was presented with the award for Best Film.

Awards
 Best Film: Beyond Sorrow, Beyond Pain by Agneta Elers-Jarleman
 Best Director: Hrafn Gunnlaugsson for When the Raven Flies
 Best Actor: Sven Wollter for The Man from Majorca and Sista leken
 Best Actress: Gunilla Nyroos for A Hill on the Dark Side of the Moon
 Special Achievement: Rune Ericson

References

External links
Official website
Guldbaggen on Facebook
Guldbaggen on Twitter
20th Guldbagge Awards at Internet Movie Database

1985 in Sweden
1984 film awards
Guldbagge Awards ceremonies
January 1985 events in Europe
1980s in Stockholm